Presbyterian College can refer to:
Presbyterian College, a private liberal arts college in Clinton, South Carolina, USA
Presbyterian College of Education, Akropong
The Presbyterian College, Montreal, a theological college affiliated with McGill University
Presbyterian Ladies' College (disambiguation), several independent girls' schools in Australia
:Category:Presbyterian universities and colleges